This is a list of institutions that compete in the National Christian College Athletic Association. There are currently 90 programs in the organization as of 2022–23.

Central Region

Division I

Mideast Region

Division I

Division II

Midwest Region

Division I

North Region

Division II

North Central Region

Division I

South Region

Division I

Division II

Southwest Region

Division II

West Region

Division I

Independent

Division II

See also
List of NCAA Division I institutions
List of NCAA Division II institutions
List of NCAA Division III institutions
List of NAIA institutions
List of USCAA institutions
List of NJCAA Division I schools
List of NJCAA Division II schools
List of NJCAA Division III schools

References

 
NCCAA
NCCAA institutions